Abdulrahman Al-Harthi (born 6 September 1998) is a Saudi Arabian professional footballer who plays as a winger for Al-Ain.

Career
Al-Harthi started his career at Al-Ahli. He signed his first professional contract with the club on 17 September 2018. On 24 July 2019, Al-Harthi left Al-Ahli and joined Al-Khaleej. He spent one season at the club making 23 appearances and scoring once. On 1 October 2020, Al-Harthi joined Al-Hazem. In his first season at the club, Al-Harthi made 23 appearances and scored 4 goals as Al-Hazem were crowned champions of the MS League. On 12 September 2021, Al-Harthi made his Pro League debut starting against Al-Shabab. On 21 August 2022, Al-Harthi joined First Division side Al-Ain.

Honours
Al-Hazem
MS League: 2020–21

References

External links
 
 

1998 births
Living people
Saudi Arabian footballers
Saudi Arabia youth international footballers
Association football wingers
Saudi First Division League players
Saudi Professional League players
Al-Ahli Saudi FC players
Khaleej FC players
Al-Hazem F.C. players
Al-Ain FC (Saudi Arabia) players